The Writers Guild of America Award for Television: Animation is an award presented by the Writers Guild of America to the best writing in an animated television program.

History
It has been presented annually since the 55th Writers Guild of America Awards in 2003 where Futurama won the first award. Before the award's inception, animated programs were submitted under their appropriate category (either episodic comedy or episodic drama). However, no animated programs received nominations. The Simpsons is the only program to win more than three awards, winning thirteen. It also holds the record for nominations with 60.

Winners and nominees

Notes
 The years denote when the episode first aired; the awards are presented the following year. Though, due to the eligibility period, some nominees could have aired in a different year. For the first 16 years, the eligibility period was December 1 to November 30. Starting in 2018, the eligibility period shifted to correspond with the calendar year (January 1 to December 31). The winners are highlighted in gold.

2000s

2010s

2020s

Total awards
Fox – 15
Netflix – 3
Comedy Central – 1

Programs with multiple awards
13 awards
The Simpsons (Fox)

3 awards 
BoJack Horseman (Netflix)

2 awards
Futurama (Fox; Comedy Central)

Programs with multiple nominations

66 nominations
The Simpsons (Fox)

13 nominations
Bob's Burgers (Fox)

9 nominations
Futurama (Fox; Comedy Central)

7 nominations
King of the Hill (Fox)
BoJack Horseman (Netflix)

3 nominations
Family Guy (Fox)

See also

 List of animation awards

References

American animation awards
Writers Guild of America Awards
Awards established in 2003
2003 establishments in the United States